The flag of Somaliland was adopted on 14 October 1996. It consists of a tricolour of green, white, and red, with a black star located in the centre. On the green stripe, there is the Shahada in white calligraphic script. 

The Constitution of Somaliland, as approved on 31 May 2001 by referendum, states at Article 7, that "the flag of the Republic of Somaliland shall consist of three horizontal, parallel and equal sections, the top section, which is colored green and has inscribed in its midst in white in Arabic language La Ilaha Ill-Allah, Muhammadan Rasulullah ('There is no god except for Allah, and Muhammad is the messenger of Allah'); the middle section is white and has at its centre a black star; and the bottom section is colored red."

Rules for the usage of the flag

The government has set out principles on how to fly the flag. It should be treated with respect and with carefulness and sensitivity. Due to the importance of the Shahada in Islam, regulations have been made on the usage of the flag.

Half mast
It is forbidden for Somalis to fly the flag at half mast because it has the Shahada (which reads in Arabic "There is no other god except God, Muhammad is the Messenger of God") written on it, and it is seen as an un-Islamic and disrespectful way to treat the flag. Moreover, if a person is seen lowering the flag to half-mast, they might be charged with flag desecration. Similar rules, for the same reason, also apply to the flags of Afghanistan, Saudi Arabia and Iraq.

Alternative flags

Although the aforementioned Article 7 clearly states that the bottom of the flag is red, some little versions have been seen with a clear orange color instead. Another variation is the orientation of the star, as many Somaliland flags have the star pointing the opposite direction from other flags.

Most Somaliland flags are of the ratio 1:2. It is based on the official ratio of the Union Flag of the United Kingdom, the former colonial power. Pictures of flags on the internet and elsewhere often erroneously show a shorter flag (of ratio 2:3).

Flags of British Somaliland

1903–50
When the British annexed and occupied Somaliland in 1903, they established a protectorate and made it part of the British Empire. The British adopted a new flag for the region (officially named British Somaliland). Like many Commonwealth countries, the flag had a defaced Blue Ensign: a blue field with the Union Flag in the upper hoist quarter of the flag. There was an image of a Kudu (an antelope native to the British Somaliland area) on a white disc. The flag was flown on ships owned by residents of British Somaliland or on government buildings in the territory.

1950–60
In 1950, the protectorate of British Somaliland's badge and flag changed and thus all flags which bore it. The flag still had the Union flag on the quarter-hoist. The kudu's head and shoulders were retained and taken off to form the most dominant feature on the new arms, although the antelope's face was now looking straight out at the observer. Between its horns, the Royal crown was inserted to symbolize the Royal family and the British Empire in general.

The badge was changed as well; it consisted of an escutcheon divided vertically into green and blue colours, having a chief with a golden Somali shield in front of two spears in saltire, heads downwards, in natural colours. The green portion contained an image of a white minaret. Moreover, on the blue quarter, an Arabian dhow in full sail on waves of the sea, with a golden anchor in the base. The kudu's head was facing forward to the observer instead of facing left on the earlier version. Above, the kudu was the Royal Crown between the horns. Underneath, there was a wreath coloured in green and yellow which formed the crest.

When British Somaliland was granted independence on 26 June 1960 the flag ceased being used.

Historical flags
The following are the flags historically used in the territory of present-day Somaliland:

See also 

 Emblem of Somaliland

References

External links

Somaliland
Culture of Somaliland
Somaliland
Somaliland
Flags of Somaliland
1993 establishments in Somalia
Somaliland
Somaliland